WMIT (106.9 MHz, "106.9 The Light") is a non-profit FM radio station licensed to Black Mountain, North Carolina. WMIT is a listener-supported ministry of the Billy Graham Evangelistic Association. It airs a mix of Contemporary Christian music with some Christian talk and teaching programs, including national religious leaders Jim Daly, John MacArthur, David Jeremiah, Chuck Swindoll and Charles Stanley. Studios and offices are on Porters Cove Road in Asheville.

In 2007, WMIT began broadcasting in the HD Radio format, adding "theEdge 106.9" on the HD2 digital subchannel.  It features Christian rock music for teenagers and young adults, which is also heard on translator W292CJ (106.3 FM) in Asheville. In addition, WMIT is heard on a simulcast AM station, WAVO 1150 in Rock Hill, South Carolina, and two FM translators in the Charlotte metropolitan area–W282BP (104.3 MHz) in Matthews, North Carolina and W268DM (101.5 MHz) in Rock Hill, as well as translator station W234CF (94.7 MHz) in Boone, North Carolina. Most of WMIT's schedule is also simulcast on 106.7 WFGW in the Knoxville, Tennessee radio market.

"Superpower" Coverage
WMIT has one of the largest coverage areas for an FM radio station in the Eastern United States. It claims a potential audience of five million people in North Carolina, South Carolina, Tennessee, Virginia and Georgia.

Its effective radiated power (ERP) is 36,000 watts.  Many FM stations nearby run at 100,000 watts but their towers are only a third the height of WMIT.  Due to its unusual height above average terrain (HAAT), WMIT is grandfathered with a "superpower" signal. In addition to its hometown of Asheville, WMIT can be heard in the Tri-Cities of Tennessee and Virginia (where it provides city-grade coverage) as well as Greenville/Spartanburg and Charlotte.

Long before the installation of the translators and the WAVO simulcast, WMIT had a large following in the Charlotte area. In January 2014, for instance, it garnered a 1.4 rating in the Charlotte market.  Since 2014, it has identified as "Black Mountain/Charlotte/Asheville."

History
In the summer of 1941, Mount Mitchell Broadcasters signed on W41MM, with 50,000 watts, on 44.1 MHz, within the old FM band. The Winston-Salem studios were eventually housed in a two-story building built in 1942 at 419 Spruce Street by the Winston-Salem Journal and The Twin City Sentinel for their AM station WSJS.

W41MM became WMIT, and moved to 97.3, when the FM band moved to 88-108 MHz.  Sometime before 1950, WMIT switched to 106.9 MHz and relocated its studios and city of license to Charlotte.

The station's call letters stand for Mount Mitchell, the highest mountain east of the Mississippi River, located about 2½ miles northeast of the station's transmitter. The two-story building housing the transmitter equipment included living space for station engineers needing to stay during difficult winter weather when the road to the top might be impassable. Diesel engines powered the station at first, but eventually power lines were installed.
    
Gordon Gray had to close the station in Spring 1950 because he did not have the time to run it. When the station returned to the air in 1951, its power was the equivalent of 325,000 watts. Six and a half million potential listeners could receive the signal. Much of the music was classical or beautiful music, though three hours a day of local, regional music was played due to listener interest.

Billy Graham's ministry purchased WMIT in 1962. At first Graham used the station to broadcast Christian instructional and preaching programs, hosted by Graham and other religious leaders, but around 2000, the station shifted its focus to airing a music-oriented Christian contemporary format, with some instructional and preaching programs during the day.

References

External links 

MIT
Radio stations established in 1941
Billy Graham